Get Nice! is the ninth studio album released by American punk rock band Zebrahead. It is the band's first album to feature original material since the release of their seventh studio album Phoenix in 2008. It is the last album to feature Greg Bergdorf as lead guitarist after his departure in 2013.

Singles and music videos
"Ricky Bobby" – Released June 10, 2011 as the lead single from the album, a music video accompanied its release.
"Get Nice!" – Released on July 9, 2011 as the second single, a music video accompanied its release in two versions; "clean" and "1970s", with the latter edited to make it look like it was filmed on TV cameras from the 1970s. Everything else in the video is identical to its "clean" version.
"She Don't Wanna Rock" – A music video for the song was released on September 26, 2011.
"Blackout" – A music video for the song was released November 30, 2011. The video is composed of footage from Zebrahead's tour in France.
"Nudist Priest" – A music video for the song was released December 21, 2011. The video is composed of footage from Zebrahead's tour in England.
"Truck Stops and Tail Lights" – A music video for the song was released January 16, 2012. The video is composed of footage from Zebrahead's tour in Germany.
"Nothing to Lose" – A music video for the song was released June 8, 2012. The video is composed of footage from Zebrahead's tour in the UK.

Track listing

Personnel
Ali Tabatabaee – lead vocals
Matty Lewis – lead vocals, rhythm guitar
Greg Bergdorf – lead guitar
Ben Osmundson – bass guitar
Ed Udhus – drums
Jason Freese – keyboards, production

Release history

References

Zebrahead albums
2011 albums